The Chuuk monarch (Metabolus rugensis), or Truk monarch, is a species of bird in the family Monarchidae. It is monotypic within the genus Metabolus. It is endemic to the island of Chuuk in Micronesia.

Taxonomy and systematics
The Chuuk monarch was originally described as belonging to the genus Muscicapa.

Description
The Chuuk monarch is a large monarch flycatcher, around 20 cm long. The plumage of this species is sexually dimorphic, with the male having almost entirely white plumage with a black face and throat and the female having entirely black plumage. The large bill is pale blue.

Distribution and habitat
The natural habitats of the Chuuk monarch are subtropical or tropical dry forests, subtropical or tropical mangrove forests, subtropical or tropical moist montane forests, subtropical or tropical moist shrubland, and plantations.

Threats
It is threatened by habitat loss, with the development of the island and the loss of its forest home.

References

External links
BirdLife Species Factsheet.

Chuuk monarch
Birds of the Federated States of Micronesia
Chuuk monarch
Chuuk monarch
Chuuk monarch
Taxonomy articles created by Polbot